The Region of Southern Denmark is an administrative region of Denmark established on Monday 1 January 2007 as part of the 2007 Danish Municipal Reform, which abolished the traditional counties ("amter") and set up five larger regions. At the same time, smaller municipalities were merged into larger units, cutting the number of municipalities from 271 before 1 January 2007 to 98. The reform diminished the power of the regional level dramatically in favor of the local level and the central government in Copenhagen. The Region of Southern Denmark has 22 municipalities. The reform was implemented in Denmark on 1 January 2007, although the merger of the Funish municipalities of Ærøskøbing and Marstal, being a part of the reform, was given the go-ahead to be implemented on Sunday 1 January 2006, one year before the main reform. It borders Schleswig-Holstein (Germany) to the south and Central Denmark Region to the north and is connected to Region Zealand via the Great Belt Fixed Link.

The regional capital is Vejle but Odense is the region's largest city and home to the main campus of the University of Southern Denmark with branch campuses in Esbjerg, Kolding and Sønderborg.
The responsibilities of the regional administration include hospitals and regional public transport, which is divided between two operators, Sydtrafik on the mainland and Als, and Fynbus on Funen and adjacent islands. On the island municipalities of Ærø (since 2016) and Fanø (since 2018), the municipalities themselves are responsible for public transport.

Geography
The Region of Southern Denmark is the westernmost of the Danish administrative regions (Region Zealand being the southernmost).

It consists of the former counties of Funen, Ribe and South Jutland, adding ten municipalities from the former Vejle County. The territories formerly belonging to Vejle County consist of the new municipalities of Fredericia (unchanged by the reform), Vejle (a merger of Vejle, Børkop, parts of Egtved, Give, and Jelling) and  Kolding (a merger of Kolding, parts of Lunderskov, Vamdrup, and parts of both Egtved and Christiansfeld - the latter from South Jutland County). A total of 78 municipalities were combined to a total of 22 new entities.

Municipalities 

The region is subdivided into 22 municipalities:

 Aabenraa
 Assens
 Billund
 Esbjerg
 Faaborg-Midtfyn
 Fanø
 Fredericia
 Haderslev
 Kerteminde
 Kolding
 Langeland
 Middelfart
 Nordfyn
 Nyborg
 Odense
 Svendborg
 Sønderborg
 Tønder
 Varde
 Vejen
 Vejle 
 Ærø

GDP

The Gross domestic product (GDP) of the region was 57.3 billion € in 2018, accounting for 19.0% of Denmark's economic output. GDP per capita adjusted for purchasing power was 35,100 € or 116% of the EU27 average in the same year.

North Schleswig Germans
The Region of Southern Denmark is home to the only officially recognised ethno-linguistic minority of Denmark proper, the North Schleswig Germans of North Schleswig. This minority makes up about 6% of the total population of the municipalities of Aabenraa/Apenrade, Haderslev/Hadersleben, Sønderborg/Sonderburg and Tønder/Tondern. In these four municipalities, the German minority enjoys certain linguistic rights in accordance with the European Charter for Regional or Minority Languages.

Regional Council
The five regions of Denmark each have a regional council of 41 members. These are elected every four years, during the local elections.

See also 
University of Southern Denmark

References

External links 

  

 
States and territories established in 2007
Regions of Denmark
2007 establishments in Denmark
German-speaking countries and territories